is a 1951 Japanese drama film directed by Kōzaburō Yoshimura. It is based on the early 11th century piece of Japanese literature of the same name. It was entered into the 1952 Cannes Film Festival.

Cast
 Kazuo Hasegawa as Hikaru Genji
 Michiyo Kogure as Fujitsubo
 Machiko Kyō as Awaji no ue
 Nobuko Otowa as Murasaki no ue
 Mitsuko Mito as Aoi no ue
 Yuji Hori as Yoshinari
 Denjirō Ōkōchi as Takuma nyudo
 Chieko Soma as Kiritsubo
 Yumiko Hasegawa as Oborozukiyo no kimi
 Chieko Higashiyama as Kobiden
 Osamu Takizawa as Kiritsubo gomon
 Kentaro Honma as Kashira
 Yuriko Hanabusa as Kiritsubo's mother
 Hisako Takihana as Nun
 Taiji Tonoyama as Priest

References

External links

1951 films
1951 drama films
Japanese drama films
1950s Japanese-language films
Japanese black-and-white films
Films directed by Kōzaburō Yoshimura
Works based on The Tale of Genji
Films based on Japanese novels
Films set in feudal Japan
Films scored by Akira Ifukube
Films produced by Masaichi Nagata
1950s Japanese films